At least two warships of Japan have been named Yaeshio:

, an  launched in 1977 and struck in 1996
, an  launched in 2004

Japanese Navy ship names
Japan Maritime Self-Defense Force ship names